Melton Hockey Club is a field hockey club based in Melton, Victoria, Australia. It was founded in 1976. The home ground is 312 Bridge Rd Melton Sth. The club moved to a hybrid pitch at a new facility in 2016 thanks to federal funding.

The men's 1st XI play in the Hockey Victoria League 3, and the ladies 1st IX play in the Hockey Victoria league 2. The club currently fields three men's teams, two women's teams, a masters team and respective youth development teams. 

Melton Hockey Club provide a supportive club environment that allows players of all ages a place to develop and belong to.

Club song
"So join in the chorus and sing it one and all,
Join in the chorus, Melton's the ball.
Good Melton Mustangs, they're champions you'll agree,
Melton will be premiers just you wait and see !"

References

External links
 
 
 
 
 
 
 
 
 

Australian field hockey clubs
Field hockey clubs established in 1976